Namsinŭiju station is a railway station in Ryŏnsang 2-dong, Sinŭiju, North P'yŏngan Province, North Korea. It is the junction point of three lines of the Korean State Railway - the P'yŏngŭi, Paengma and Tŏkhyŏn lines.

History
Opened on 1 October 1938 as Namsinŭiju interlocking, it was reclassified as a station on 16 October 1943 and renamed Namsinŭiju station.

References

Railway stations in North Korea
Buildings and structures in North Pyongan Province
Sinuiju